is a 1993 action video game for the Mega Drive.

Gameplay

This video game is a futuristic action game involving an ultra-competitive sporting event. Two robot crabs are controlled by men who play the game merely to become wealthy and famous. There is a conveyor belt behind them that spews metal balls at them. The goal is to capture balls that belong to the opponent and keep them from him until time runs out. Balls can also be knocked out from the mechanical hands of the opponent. All damaged crabs must return to the pit area for a quick maintenance and repair session.

There are several modes: a world championship against increasingly tougher opponents, a multiplayer versus mode, a training mode, and a time trial where the time limit is the only foe.

Reception

The game was poorly received, with Andy Dyer criticising the graphics, sound, gameplay and size.

References

1993 video games
Action video games
Namco games
Science fiction video games
Sega Genesis-only games
Sega Genesis games
Multiplayer and single-player video games
Video games developed in Japan